Melanopleurus pyrrhopterus is a species of seed bug in the family Lygaeidae. It is found in the continental United States, Mexico, and has also been recorded in Canada.

Subspecies 
There are two recognized subspecies of Melanopleurus pyrrhopterus:

 Melanopleurus pyrrhopterus melanopleurus (Uhler, 1893)
 Melanopleurus pyrrhopterus pyrrhopterus (Stål, 1874)

References

Further reading 

 Slater, Alex. (August 30, 1992). A genus level revision of western hemisphere Lygaeinae (Heteroptera: Lygaeidae) with keys to species. The University of Kansas Science Bulletin 55(1). pp. 21-22. DOI: 10.5962/bhl.part.772

Lygaeidae
Insects described in 1874